Brucella vulpis is a  Gram-negative, non-spore-forming and non-motile bacteria from the family of Brucella which has been isolated from the mandibular lymph nodes of foxes (Vulpes vulpes).

References

Bacteria described in 2016